Sanders is a patronymic name, meaning "son of Alexander". The name derives from the abbreviation xander, with Alexander deriving from the Greek "Ἀλέξανδρος" (Aléxandros), meaning "Defender of the people".

Other known spelling variations: Sander, Saunder, Saunders, Zander, Sender, Zender and more, although different variants may have other origins (such as places like Zandt or Senden). The surname originates from Germany, The Netherlands, England, Scotland, and Ireland in most cases.

Notable persons with that surname include:

A
Ace Sanders (born 1991), American football player
Addison Hiatt Sanders (1823–1912), American Civil War brevet brigadier general and Secretary of the Montana Territory
Adrian Sanders (born 1959), British politician
Ajai Sanders (born 1974), American actress and stand-up comedian
Al Sanders (1941–1995), American news broadcaster
Albert Sanders (1889–1957), Canadian politician in Alberta
Alex Sanders (1926–1988), Wiccan priest
Alex Sanders, American judge and politician
Alex Sanders (born 1966), American pornographic actor
Alvin Sanders (born 1952), American actor
Amy Sanders (born 1983), American basketball player
Andries Sanders (born 1933), Dutch psychologist
Angelia Bibbs-Sanders (born 1961), American executive in the entertainment business
Ann Sanders (born 1960), Australian television journalist and news presenter
Anne Sanders (born 1931), English cricketer
Annemarie Sanders (born 1958), Dutch equestrian
Anthony Sanders (born 1974), American baseball player
Antoon Sanders (1586–1664), Flemish cleric and historian
Antwoine Sanders (born 1977), American football player
Anucha Browne Sanders, former women's basketball player
April Sanders, Canadian politician
Archie D. Sanders (1857–1941), American politician
Art Sanders, American news anchor
Arthur Sanders (1898–1974), Royal Air Force air marshal
Arthur Sanders (1900–1920), English cricketer
Arthur Sanders (1901–1983), English footballer

B
Barefoot Sanders (1925–2008), American judge 
Barry Sanders (born 1938), American sociolinguist
Barry Sanders (born 1968), American running back for the Detroit Lions
Barry J. Sanders (born 1994), American football running back
Ben Sanders (1865–1930), American baseball player
Benita Sanders (born 1935), Canadian printmaker
Bernie Sanders (born 1941), American politician, Democratic presidential candidate in 2016 and 2020
Bev Sanders (born 1953), American snowboarder
Beverly Sanders (born 1940), American actress, comedian and voice artist
Bill Sanders (1930–2021), American political cartoonist
Billy Sanders (1955–1985), Australian international speedway rider
Billy C. Sanders (born 1936), U.S. Navy sailor and master chief petty officer of the navy
Bob Sanders (born 1953), American football coach
Bob Sanders (born 1981), American football safety
Brandon Sanders (born 1973), American football player
Braylon Sanders (born 1999), American football player
Bryan Sanders (born 1970), American ski jumper

C
C. J. Sanders (born 1996), American actor, son of the wide receiver Chris Sanders
Cameron Sanders (born 1958), American journalist
Candice Sanders (born 1977), American beauty pageant contestant
Carl Sanders (1925–2014), American politician
Carl Julian Sanders (1912–2007), American Methodist bishop
Carol Sanders (1932–2012), American bridge player
Charlie Sanders (1946–2015), American football player
Charlie Sanders (born 1979), American actor, comedian, and writer 
Cheryl J. Sanders, African-American womanist scholar and ethicist 
Chris Sanders (born 1962), American film animator and voice actor
Chris Sanders (born 1972), American football wide receiver
Chris Sanders (born 1973), American football running back
Chris Sanders (born 1977), American football quarterback
Christoph Sanders (born 1968), American actor
Colonel Sanders (1890–1980), pseudonym of Harland David Sanders, the founder of Kentucky Fried Chicken
Corey Sanders (born 1975), American boxer
Corrie Sanders (1966–2012), South African boxer

D
Dale Sanders (born 1953), British biochemist and plant biologist
Dale Sanders (born 1957), American railroad photographer
Daniel Sanders (1819–1897), German lexicographer
Daniel Sanders (born 1986), American football player
Daniel P. Sanders, American graph theorist
Danny Sanders (born 1955), American football player
Darius Sanders (born 1983), American football player
Darnell Sanders (born 1979), American football player
Daryl Sanders (born 1941),  American football player
David Sanders, American biologist and politician
David Sanders (born 1979), American baseball pitcher
David J. Sanders (born 1975), American politician
Deac Sanders (born 1950), American football player
Dee Sanders (1921–2007), American baseball pitcher
Deion Sanders (born 1967), American baseball and football player
Denis Sanders (1929–1987), American film director, screenwriter and producer
Dirk Sanders (1934–2002), French dancer, actor and choreographer
Donald Sanders (1930–1999), American lawyer, key figure in the Watergate investigation
Dori Sanders (born 1939), African-American novelist 
Doug Sanders (1933–2020), American professional golfer

E
E. P. Sanders (1937-2022), American New Testament scholar
Ecstasia Sanders (born 1985), Canadian film actress
Ed Sanders (1930–1954), American boxer
Ed Sanders (born 1939), American poet, singer, social activist
Ed Sanders (born 1968), English carpenter, actor and television host
Ed Sanders (born 1993), British actor and singer
Edmundo Sanders (1924–1991), Argentine broadcaster and actor
Edward Sanders (1888–1943), Australian politician
Eleanor Butler Sanders (1849 – 1905) was an American suffragist, and socialite.
Emmanuel Sanders (born 1987), American football player
Eric Sanders (disambiguation), multiple people
Erin Sanders (born 1991), American actress
Evan Sanders (born 1981), Indonesian actor
Everett Sanders (1882–1950), American politician
Ewoud Sanders (born 1958), Dutch historian of the Dutch language and journalist

F
Felicia Sanders (1922–1975), American pop singer
Francesca Sanders, American playwright
Frank Sanders (1949–2012), American ice hockey player
Frank Sanders (born 1973), American football player
Frank P. Sanders (1919–1997), American under secretary of the navy
Fyodor Ivanovich Sanders (1755–1836), Russian general

G
Gene Sanders (born 1956), American football player
George Sanders (1894–1950), English recipient of the Victoria Cross in World War I
George Sanders (1906–1972), British actor
George Harry Sanders, English-born American musician, father of the writer Ronald Sanders
George Nicholas Sanders (1812–1873), American official suspected in the assassination of Abraham Lincoln
Gillian Sanders (born 1981), South African triathlete

H
Harland Sanders (better known as Colonel Sanders)  (1890–1980), founder of KFC  (Kentucky Fried Chicken)
Helena Sanders (1911–1997), Cornish humanitarian, cultural activist, politician and, poet
Helma Sanders-Brahms (1940-2014), German film director
Henry Sanders (born 1944), Alabama politician
Henry G. Sanders (born 1942), African-American actor
Henry Russell Sanders (1905–1958), American football player and coach
Herbert Sanders (1878–1938), English-born Canadian organist and composer
Horace T. Sanders (1820–1865), American politician and military leader
Hugh Sanders (1911–1966), American actor

I
Ian Sanders (born 1961), British cricketer

J
Jackie Wolcott Sanders, American diplomat
James Sanders (born ca. 1952), American basketball player for the Harlem Globetrotters
James Sanders (born 1955), American architect and designer
James Sanders, Jr. (born 1957), New York State politician
James Sanders (born 1983), American football player
James A. Sanders (1927–2020), American biblical scholar
Jamie Sanders, American horse racing jockey and trainer
Jan Sanders (1919–2000), Dutch painter
Jan Sanders van Hemessen (c. 1500–c. 1566), Flemish painter
Jared Y. Sanders, Sr. (1869–1944), American politician
Jasmine Sanders, German-American model
Jason Sanders (born 1995), American football player
Jay O. Sanders (born 1953), American character actor
Jeff Sanders (born 1966), American basketball player
Jeremy Sanders, British chemist
Jerry Sanders III (born 1936), American businessman, co-founder of Advanced Micro Devices (AMD)
Jerry Sanders (born 1950), American politician, chief of police and Mayor of San Diego
Jesse Sanders (born 1989), American basketball player
Jim Sanders (1900–1981), New Zealand rugby player
Jimmy Sanders (1902–1975), American minor league baseball player and manager
Jimmy Sanders (1920–2003), English footballer
Jock Sanders (born 1988), Canadian gridiron football player
Joe Sanders (1896–1965), American jazz pianist, singer, and bandleader
John Sanders (1768–1826), British architect 
John Sanders (1933–2003), English musician associated with the tradition of Anglican church music
John Sanders (1945–2022), American baseball player and coach
John Sanders, American sports broadcaster
John C. C. Sanders (1840–1864), brigadier-general in the Confederate States Army
John E. Sanders (born 1956), American evangelical Christian theologian
John Oswald Sanders (1917–1992), New Zealand lawyer and author
Johnny Sanders (1922–1990), American football executive
Jon Sanders (born 1939), Australian yachtsman
Joop Sanders (born 1921), Dutch-born American abstract painter
Joseph Sanders (1877–1960), German-American who helped invent the record player and helicopter
Joseph G. Sanders (1828–1866), military officer in the American Civil War who fought for both the Union and the Confederacy
Julia Sanders,  motorcyclist

K
Karl Sanders (born 1964), American musician and founding member of the band Nile
Kelsey Sanders (born 1990), American actress
Ken Sanders (baseball) (born 1941), American baseball pitchers
Ken Sanders (born 1950), American football player
Ken Sanders (born 1951), American book dealer
Kenny Sanders (born ca. 1967), former college basketball player for George Mason University
Kerry Sanders, American news correspondent
Kevin Sanders (born 1964), British motorcyclist, world record holder for circumnavigation
Kevin Sanders (born 1982), American musician of the Georgia band Cartel
Keylee Sue Sanders, Miss Kansas Teen USA and Miss Teen USA 1995
Kim Sanders (born 1968), American singer and songwriter

L
Larry Sanders (born 1935), British politician
Larry Sanders (born 1954), American R&B singer better known as L.V.
Larry Sanders (born 1988), American basketball player
Lawrence Sanders (1920–1998), American novelist
Lee Sanders, American composer
Lewis Sanders (born 1978), American football player
Lewis A. Sanders, American businessman
Leyland Sanders (1927–2005), Australian sportsman
Lisa Sanders (born 1956), American physician and journalist
Lloyd Charles Sanders (1857–1927), English writer and biographer
Loni Sanders (born 1958), American porn star and adult model
Lonnie Sanders (born 1941), American football player
Lou Sanders, British comedian, writer and actress
Louk Sanders (born 1950), Dutch tennis player
Luc Sanders (born 1945), Belgian footballer
Lucy Sanders (born 1954), CEO and co-founder of the NCWIT

M
Marieke Sanders-Ten Holte (born 1941), Dutch politician
Marion K. Sanders (1905–1977), American journalist, editor, and author
Mark Sanders (disambiguation)
Marlene Sanders (1931–2015), American news broadcaster
Marvin Sanders (born 1967), American football secondary coach
Mary Sanders (born 1985), Canadian rhythmic gymnast
Mary Jo Sanders (born 1974), American boxer
Matthew Charles Sanders a.k.a. "M. Shadows" (born 1981), American heavy metal singer
Maxine Sanders (born 1946), prominent member of the Wiccan faith and a co-founder of Alexandrian Wicca
Melvin Sanders (born 1981), American basketball player
Michael Sinclair Sanders (born 1939), American parapsychologist and amateur archeologist
Mike Sanders (basketball) (born 1960), American professional basketball player
Mike Sanders (Missouri politician) (born 1967), Missouri politician
Mike Sanders (wrestler) (born 1969), American stand-up comedian and former professional wrestler
Miles Sanders (born 1997), American football player
Mo Sanders (born 1971), American roller skater
Morgan Sanders (1934–2021), American painter, photographer, and children's book author
Morgan G. Sanders (1878–1956), American politician
Moses Sanders (1873–1941), English footballer

N
Neill Sanders (1923–1992), British French horn player
Newell Sanders (1850–1938), Chattanooga businessman and former senator from Tennessee
Nicholas Sanders (c. 1530–1581), English Roman Catholic priest and historian
Nick Sanders, the current Guinness World Record holder for fastest motorcycle circumnavigation
Nick Sanders (musician), American jazz pianist and composer
Nicola Sanders (born 1982), British sprinter and hurdler
Noel Devine Sanders (born 1988), American college football running back
Norm Sanders (born 1932), American-Australian politician, activist

O
Otto Liman von Sanders (1855–1929), German general

P
Pat Sanders, Canadian curler
Patrick Sanders (born 1985), American basketball player
Paul Sanders (born 1967), Anglo-German historian and management scholar
Peters Sanders (1911–2003), Indian Army officer
Peter Sanders (born 1942), Welsh football and rugby player
Pharoah Sanders (1940–2022), American jazz saxophonist
Phoenix Sanders (born 1995), American baseball player
Prentice E. Sanders (1937-2021), San Francisco chief of police

R
Rakim Sanders (born 1989), American basketball player
Randy Sanders (born 1965), American football coach
Ray Sanders (baseball) (1916–1983), American baseball player
Ray Sanders (1935–2019), American country music artist
Rebecca Sanders (born 1982), Australian field hockey player
Reggie Sanders (1949–2002), American baseball first baseman
Reggie Sanders (born 1967), American baseball right fielder
Ric Sanders (born 1952), English violinist
Richard Sanders (born 1940), American actor
Richard Sanders (born 1949), American author and magazine editor
Richard B. Sanders, Washington State Supreme Court justice
Richard C. Sanders (1915–1976), American general officer of the United States Air Force
Rick Sanders (1945–1972), Olympic silver gold medalist in amateur wrestling
Ricky Sanders (born 1962), American football player
Ricky Sanders (born 1966), American NASCAR racing driver
Robert Sanders, 1st Baron Bayford (1867–1940), English politician
Robert Levine Sanders (1906–1974), American composer and conductor
Robin R. Sanders, American ambassador to several African nations
Ronald Sanders (film editor), Canadian film editor and television producer
Ronald Sanders (diplomat) (born 1948), Antiguan Barbudan academic, diplomat and journalist
Ronald Sanders (writer) (1932–1991), American journalist and writer
Roy Sanders (1892–1950), American National League baseball pitcher
Roy Sanders (1894–1963), American League baseball pitcher
Rupert Sanders (born 1971), British film director
Ruth Sanders (1886–1988), British poet and author
Ruth Sanders Cordes (1890–1988), American tennis player

S
Sam Sanders (born 1938), American football coach and player
Samuel Sanders (1937–1999), American classical pianist
Sarah Huckabee Sanders, American politician and former press secretary, 47th Governor of Arkansas
Satch Sanders (born 1938), American basketball player and coach
Scott Sanders (born 1945), American novelist and essayist
Scott Sanders (born 1950s), American navy admiral
Scott Sanders (born 1957), American film, television, and theatrical producer
Scott Sanders (born 1968), American screenwriter and film director
Scott Sanders (born 1969), American baseball pitcher
Seb Sanders (born 1971), English race jockey
Sol Sanders (1926–2022), American journalist
Spencer Sanders (born 1999), American football player
Steve Sanders (born 1978), English footballer
Steve Sanders (born 1982), American football player
Storm Sanders (born 1994), Australian tennis player
Sue Sanders (born 1947), British LGBT rights activist
Summer Sanders (born 1972), American swimmer, sports broadcaster, and actress

T
Teee Sanders (born 1968), American volleyball player 
Terence Sanders (1901–1985), British rower
Terry Sanders (born 1931), American film producer and director
Thomas Sanders (1836–1874), Quebec merchant and politician
Thomas Sanders (born 1962), American football player
Thomas Sanders (entertainer), American actor and YouTuber
Thomas E. Sanders, production designer
Thomas Ernest "Satch" Sanders (born 1938), American basketball player and coach
Thomas K. Sanders (d. 2011), American bridge player
Tim Sanders (writer) (born 1961), American author, public speaker, and former Yahoo! executive
Tim Sanders (footballer) (born 1986), Dutch footballer
Tim Sanders (politician) (born 1982), American politician in the Minnesota House of Representatives
Timothy Greenfield-Sanders (born 1952), American portrait photographer
Tom Sanders, British mathematician
Tommy Sanders (born 1954), American sportscaster
Tony Sanders (1957–2015), American poet
Troy Sanders (1901–1959), American composer and musician
Troy Sanders (born 1973), American heavy metal bassist and singer

V
Vince Sanders (born 1935), American broadcaster
Viola B. Sanders (1921–2013), American deputy director of Women in the Navy
Violet Sanders (1904-1983), British artist

W
Wade Sanders, American attorney and sex offender
War Sanders (1877–1962), American baseball pitcher
Wilbur F. Sanders (1834–1905), American lawyer and Senator from Montana
Wilfred Sanders (1910–1965), English cricketer
Will Sanders (born 1965), Dutch French horn player
William Sanders (1871–1941), British Labour Party politician
William Sanders (born 1941), American businessman
William Sanders (1942–2017), American science fiction writer
William Sanders, American statistician
William David Sanders (1951–1999), American teacher and victim of Columbine High School massacre
William Edward Sanders (1883–1917), New Zealand Victoria Cross recipient in World War I
William Joseph Sanders, American vertebrate paleontologist
William P. Sanders (1833–1863), officer in the Union Army in the American Civil War

Z
Zebrie Sanders (born 1989), American football player

Fictional characters 
Charles, Elizabeth, Jamie, Judith & Kate Sanders, characters from the soap opera One Life to Live
Greg Sanders, fictional character featured on the US crime drama television show CSI: Crime Scene Investigation, played by Eric Szmanda
James Sanders, a.k.a. Speed Demon fictional character featured in the Marvel Universe.
Larry Sanders, fictional character played by Garry Shandling on the American television series The Larry Sanders Show
Micah Sanders, character portrayed by Noah Gray-Cabey on the NBC science fiction drama series Heroes
Niki Sanders, character portrayed by Ali Larter in the television series Heroes
 Shiera Sanders, a.k.a. Hawkgirl fictional character featured in the DC Universe.
Stephen Sanders, alias used by the Marvel Comics character Doctor Strange
Steve Sanders, character in the American television drama Beverly Hills, 90210
Terry Sanders Jr., character in the anime OVA Mobile Suit Gundam: The 08th MS Team
Sanders, a character in the Canadian animated reality television series Total Drama Presents: The Ridonculous Race. Her first name is yet to be revealed.
Colonel Beauregard Sanders, from an episode of The Scooby-Doo Show

See also 
Sander (name)
Sandars (disambiguation)
Sanderson (disambiguation)

References

Dutch-language surnames
English-language surnames
Patronymic surnames
Surnames from given names

de:Sanders
fr:Sanders